Luhe District (sometimes read as Liùhé Qū) is one of 11 districts of Nanjing, the capital of Jiangsu province, China.

As with most non-locals, famed broadcaster Zhu Xun once pronounced the name of Luhe District as Liuhe instead of Luhe.

Administrative divisions
In the present, Luhe (Liuhe) District has 10 subdistricts and 10 towns.
10 subdistricts

10 towns

Climate

References

www.xzqh.org

External links
Government's official website

County-level divisions of Jiangsu
Districts of Nanjing